is a Japanese football player. He last played defender for the Brisbane Strikers in the National Premier Leagues Queensland.

Career

Early career in Japan
After playing with Shiogama NTFC Wiese's youth team, Omori enrolled as a student at Kanto Gakuin University. In his third year, he was selected to be a representative at Kanto University qualifying tournaments of the Denso Cup.

In 2013, he joined Japan Football League side Blaublitz Akita leaving one year later for SC Sagamihara in the newly formed J3 League. He played for the club for 2 years before choosing to leave the side at the end of 2015.

Brisbane Strikers
On 24 August 2016, Omori scored from a free-kick in the 34th minute against A-League side Melbourne City in an FFA Cup match to start the scoring. Due to his notable performances, he was given a trial with A-League side, Brisbane Roar.

References

External links
 
 
 NPL Queensland Statistics

1990 births
Living people
People from Ishinomaki
Kanto Gakuin University alumni
Association football people from Miyagi Prefecture
Japanese footballers
J3 League players
Japan Football League players
Blaublitz Akita players
SC Sagamihara players
Brisbane Strikers FC players
Japanese expatriate footballers
Expatriate soccer players in Australia
Association football defenders